Logisticus modestus is a species of beetle in the family Cerambycidae. It was described by Waterhouse in 1882.

References

Dorcasominae
Beetles described in 1882